Ala Al-Kuwaikabi (born 30 August 1980) is a football wing midfielder playing at Al-Nasr Club in Saudi Arabia.

He joined Al-Nasr in the winter of 2009 coming from Al-Wahda FC (Mecca).

References

1980 births
Living people
Saudi Arabian footballers
Saudi Arabia international footballers
Al-Wehda Club (Mecca) players
Al-Shabab FC (Riyadh) players
Al Nassr FC players
Saudi First Division League players
Saudi Professional League players
Association football forwards